The University Athletic Association (UAA) is an American athletic conference that competes in the National Collegiate Athletic Association's (NCAA) Division III.  Member schools are highly selective universities located in Georgia, Illinois, Missouri, Pennsylvania, Massachusetts, Ohio, and New York. The eight members are Brandeis University, Carnegie Mellon University, Case Western Reserve University, Emory University, New York University, The University of Chicago, University of Rochester, and Washington University in St. Louis.

Academics 
All UAA member schools are private, and ranked in the top 50 of national research universities by U.S. News & World Report's Best Colleges Rankings. Historically, the division was colloquially called the "egghead eight", or "nerdy nine" when Johns Hopkins was a member. This stems both from the academic strength of the member schools, and the fact that the conference prioritizes academic achievement over athletic prowess.
The UAA was the only NCAA conference to have all of its member institutions affiliated with the Association of American Universities, a collection of 65 Ph.D.-granting research institutions, with 63 in the United States and two in Canada, from 2011, when Nebraska joined the previously all-AAU Big Ten, until 2019 when Dartmouth became the last Ivy League institution to join the AAU.

History

Chronological timeline
 1986 - In 1986, the University Athletic Association (UAA) was founded. Charter members included Carnegie Mellon University, Case Western Reserve University, Emory University, Johns Hopkins University, New York University, the University of Chicago, the University of Rochester, and Washington University in St. Louis, effective beginning the 1986-87 academic year.
 1987 - Brandeis University joined the UAA, effective in the 1987-88 academic year.
 2001 - Johns Hopkins left the UAA to fully align all its sports into the Centennial Conference, effective after the 2000-01 academic year.
 2018 - The UAA dropped football as a sponsored sport, due to its members joining on other athletic conferences for that sport as affiliates or associates, effective after the 2017 fall season (2017-18 academic year).

Member schools

Current members 
The UAA currently has eight full members, all are private schools:

Notes

Former member
The UAA had one former full member, which was also a private school:

Notes

Membership timeline

Conference facilities

Sports
The UAA sanctions competition in the following sports:

Participation

Men

References

External links
 

 
Organizations based in Rochester, New York
College sports in Missouri
Sports in the Eastern United States
1986 establishments in the United States